Mebane Commercial Historic District is a national historic district located at Mebane, Alamance County, North Carolina. It encompasses 30 contributing buildings, and 1 contributing structure in the central business district of Mebane.  The district includes one and two-part commercial blocks of one to three stories in height, executed in the Colonial Revival and Neo-Classical styles. The earliest buildings date to about 1905. Notable buildings include two former banks (c. 1910, c. 1919), the Five Star Building (c. 1910), Mebane Enterprise Building (c. 1940), and Jones Department Store Building (c. 1910).

It was added to the National Register of Historic Places in 2011.

References

Historic districts on the National Register of Historic Places in North Carolina
Neoclassical architecture in North Carolina
Colonial Revival architecture in North Carolina
Historic districts in Alamance County, North Carolina
National Register of Historic Places in Alamance County, North Carolina